The 2013 Mercer Bears football team represented Mercer University in the 2013 NCAA Division I FCS football season. They were led by first-year head coach Bobby Lamb and played their home games at the Moye Complex. They were a member of the Pioneer Football League (PFL). This was Mercer's first year sponsoring football since 1941. This was also their only season as a member of the PFL as they joined the Southern Conference in 2014. They finished the season 10–2 overall and 6–2 in conference play, placing third in the PFL.

Schedule

Awards
 2013 Pioneer Football League Freshman Offensive Player of the Year
 John Russ

Finalists
Players

 Jerry Rice Award
John Russ

Coaches
 Eddie Robinson Award
Bobby Lamb

Honors

All-PFL
Mercer had two players featured in the All-PFL selections:
First Team
Tosin Aguebor
Second Team
Robert Brown
Honorable Mentions
JaTarii Donald
Kirby Southard
Alex Avant
Tyler Zielenske

References

Mercer
Mercer Bears football seasons
Mercer Bears football